The Social-Political Movement of the Roma is a political party in Moldova.

References

External links
 Roma people calling political parties to consolidation
 Roma creating a party 
 Mişcarea Romilor din Republica Moldova (MRRM) 
 Mişcarea Social Politică a Romilor – 100 mii de voturi şi în Parlament

Political parties in Moldova
Political parties established in 2010
Romani in Moldova
Romani political parties
2010 establishments in Moldova